Kim Min-woo may refer to:
 Kim Min-woo (infielder) (born 1979), South Korean baseball player
 Kim Min-woo (figure skater) (born 1986), South Korean ice dancer
 Kim Min-woo (footballer) (born 1990), South Korean football player
 Kim Min-woo (pitcher) (born 1995), South Korean baseball player